BaghTel (from Baghdad and Telecom) is the leading wireless Internet service provider (WISP) in Baghdad, Iraq, and it is officially registered as a company in the Iraq companies directory. It was established in May 28 2003 as an Internet provider, the first internet provider in Baghdad after the invasion of Baghdad . It was written about us in US newspapers and attracted many people from all over Baghdad.

External links
 

Internet service providers of Iraq
Companies based in Baghdad